Pa Daet ( can refer to
 Pa Daet District, Chiang Rai province
 Pa Daet, Pa Daet a subdistrict of Pa Daet district, Chiang Rai province
 Pa Daet, Mae Suai a  subdistrict of Mae Suai district, Chiang Rai province
 Pa Daet, Mueang Chiang Mai, a sub-district of Mueang Chiang Mai district, Chiang Mai province